Georges Smal (1928–1988) was a Belgian writer who wrote mainly in the Walloon language. He was born in Houyet and died at Namur. He worked with Hubert Haas and Jean Guillaume, among many others.

References

Belgian writers in Walloon
People from Namur (province)
1928 births
1988 deaths